The Portland Bureau of Transportation (or PBOT) is the agency tasked with maintaining the city of Portland's transportation infrastructure. Bureau staff plan, build, manage and maintain a transportation system with the goal of providing people and businesses access and mobility. The Bureau received significant media coverage in 2017 for employee hazing within its maintenance operations.

Organization
The mayor assigns a city commissioner to be commissioner in charge of the Portland Bureau of Transportation. The commissioner in charge appoints a director, who leads the Bureau in its day-to-day business.

In June 2013 Mayor Charlie Hales appointed Steve Novick commissioner in charge. Novick appointed Leah Treat director in July 2013 following a nationwide search. She replaced Interim Director Toby Widmer, who had been appointed following the resignation of former Director Tom Miller. Interim director Chris Warner replaced Leah Treat in July 2018 after Treat's resignation.

According to the most recent budget, the Bureau is led by the Office of the Director, which directly oversees communication and six division managers as follows: 
 Development Services and Streetcar
 Planning and Capital Services
 System Management (Parking Enforcement, Parking Operations, Parking Garages, Active Transportation, Traffic District Operations, Traffic Design and Regulatory Operations)
 Business Services (Finance and Accounting, Asset Management, Business Technology, Employee Services, Administrative Services)
 Engineering and Technical Services (Civil Design, Bridges and Structures, Survey, Construction Inspection and Pavement, and Signals and Street Lights) 
 Maintenance Operations (Construction and Operations, Environmental System and Street Systems)

The City Auditor ombudsman's office which takes in complaints from the general public concerning city bureaus reported in its 2018 annual report that they routinely receive the most complaints about PBOT. They concluded that "several of our complaint investigations found structural unfairness within transportation programs, requiring reform." Sidewalk and vehicle towing concerns represented the greatest number of complaints made with the ombudsman's office about PBOT in 2001.

Maintenance operations

2016 hazing incident 
In May 2017, Willamette Week first reported PBOT's maintenance leader had subjected subordinates to various forms of hazing, such as shooting BBs and popcorn kernels at them. The report obtained by the paper which was based on interviews with nine employees characterized the workplace culture at PBOT maintenance shop as a place of "violence, hazing and bigotry inside a shop that prizes loyalty and punishes "snitching." The investigation was focused around a longtime city employee Jerry Munson who was the crew leader for the "liner crew" maintenance branch. After learning of hazing, city officials transferred the "ring leader" and terminated one of the whistleblowers. An internal investigation of the agency later yielded a pattern of "workplace harassment, intimidation, discrimination, dishonesty, retaliation on the basis of sexual orientation and physical violence". One victim, Adam Rawlins, said that between Augusts 2016 and December 2016, he had been subject to numerous pranks by other employees while he was working at PBOT. His lawsuit, which sought $250,000, indicated that pranks included "being locked in a dark shed while being bound with duct tape and zip ties." The city settled with Rawlins for $80,000 citing "risk the city may be found liable."

Parking Enforcement Division 

The parking enforcement division under PBOT enforces city's parking regulations per title 16 chapter 16.10 of city code. A consultant report obtained by The Oregonian reported Parking Enforcement Division's method is "unprofessional and leaves room for “favoritism” and “illegal conduct"

2014 abandoned auto scrapping scandal 
A PBOT Parking Enforcement Division parking enforcement officer Barbara Lorraine Peterson, a special police officer was convicted of official misconduct in May 2014 for her role in tipping off and accepting kickback for each vehicle tagged as abandoned to illegal tow truck operators whom in turn took them to a crushing yard. This followed an investigation into auto theft. It was found that more than three dozen vehicle owners were victims of illegal scrapping operation in which Peterson had a role. Under standard procedures, vehicles identified as abandoned are tagged, and the owners are given 72 hours to take care of it. Instead, a PBOT parking enforcement officer was tipping off rogue tow truck drivers soon after they were tagged and they took them to a crushing yard before 72 hours had elapsed. The officer in question received a kickback from the tow truck operators for each vehicle she tipped off.

Planning and Capital Services 
The Oregonian reports PBOT's then director Leah Treat signed off on hiring Millicent Williams, a candidate with felony conviction for her role in diverting funds from a non-profit she was leading. She started with a salary of $112,000 in January, 2017. Williams pleaded guilty for "diverting $100,000 intended for youth programs to pay for a 2009 inaugural ball."

Mobile parking payment 
In May 2017, PBOT announced that they were launching mobile payment service Parking Kitty, which would allow drivers to pay for parking through a mobile app.

Budget

Historical budget 
The bureau's total FY 2016-17 Adopted Budget is $376.0 million. Of that amount, the Capital Improvement Plan for FY 2016-17 totals $91.1 million During FY 201415, the Bureau employed 749 staff members. The managed assets totaled $8.4 billion in public assets from streets and bridges to traffic signals and street lights at the time Asset Status and Condition Report 2013 was published

The Portland Bureau of Transportation has a roughly $309 million budget for FY 201415. The bulk of the money comes from year-to year carryover ($59 million), bonds and notes proceeds ($51 million), gas taxes ($62.7 million), contracts with other city agencies ($30.7 million), fees for permits and other services ($27.1 million) and parking meters ($25.4 million). Remaining sources included parking garages, the city's general fund, parking citations and local parking permits.

The budget is then split into two categories: discretionary and restricted. Nearly two-thirds of the budget falls in the restricted category, meaning the Bureau must follow certain spending guidelines depending on where the money comes from.

The Bureau's FY 201415 discretionary budget is $108.3 million in all. It was spent as follows: Operations ($28 million), maintenance ($27.9 million), overhead and administration ($14.5 million) and construction projects (11.3 million). Another $26 million was spent on various bureau programs, contingencies and reserves.

Renewable energy funding
The City of Portland paid $119,000 per month for SoloPower's default on a loan the City guaranteed under Mayor Sam Adams in 2011. The payments continued until October, 2020. The money is taken out of Portland's Bureau of Transportation. The Bureau of Transportation pays because parking-meter revenue was used as guaranty.

Statistics and assets
The Portland Bureau of Transportation is responsible for:
 4,842 lane miles of streets
 2,520 miles of sidewalks
 922 signalized traffic intersections
 55,477 street lights (City owns them all, but operates only 11,284 of them.)
 157 bridges
 26 miles of roadside barriers
 1753 parking meters (410 single meters, 1,343 pay stations)
 Six parking garages
 331 miles of bike lanes
The Bureau also owns the Portland Streetcar and the Portland Aerial Tram, though they are operated by Portland Streetcar Inc. and the Oregon Health & Science University respectively.

See also
 Transportation in Portland, Oregon
 TriMet

References

External links
 Portland Bureau of Transportation
 Portland Aerial Tram
 Portland Streetcar

Transportation in Portland, Oregon
Government of Portland, Oregon